A pencil case or pencil box is a container used to store pencils. A pencil case can also contain a variety of other stationery such as sharpeners, pens, glue sticks, erasers, scissors, rulers and calculators.

Pencil cases can be made from a variety of materials such as wood or metal. Some pencil cases have a hard and rigid shell encasing the pens inside, while others use a softer material such as plastic, leather or cotton. Soft versions are typically fastened with a zipper. 

The intent of having a pencil case is for easy portability of small items such as pencils. They may also contain other stationery such as pens, glue sticks and staplers. Some pencil cases double as make up bags.

Early pencil cases were round or cylindrical in shape. Some early pencil cases were decorated with jasper (one from 1860) or platinum (from 1874). In 1946, the first patent for a pencil case was placed in the United States. This patent was made by Verona Pearl Amoth, who also invented other tools of the field like replaceable erasers for pencils.

See also

 Pencils
 School
 Pencil sharpeners
 Marker pens
 Pens
 Suzuri-bako (Japanese writing box)
 Eraser

References

Containers
Stationery